Batman: Soul of the Dragon is a 2021 American animated superhero film produced by Warner Bros. Animation and DC Entertainment. It is the 40th film of the DC Universe Animated Original Movies. The film is directed by Sam Liu and executive produced by Bruce Timm featuring an original story not based on any comic. It features the voices of David Giuntoli as Bruce Wayne / Batman, Mark Dacascos as Richard Dragon, Kelly Hu as Lady Shiva, Michael Jai White as Ben Turner / Bronze Tiger, James Hong as O-Sensei, Jamie Chung as Jade Nguyen and Josh Keaton as Jeffrey Burr.

Plot
In Bruce Wayne's younger years, while training himself to become a vigilante crime-fighter, he travels to Nanda Parbat, a secret monastery in the Hindu Kush Himalayan region, where he meets its caretaker, O-Sensei, and five other students training in the martial arts; Shiva, Richard Dragon, Jade, Ben Turner and Rip Jagger. O-Sensei eventually entrusts Shiva with Soul Breaker, a Muramasa sword in his possession, but otherwise remains secretive about a certain door at the monastery's outer perimeter. One night, Rip penetrates the forbidden door and kills Jade with Soul Breaker, which is the key to a mystical gate O-Sensei was guarding. This gate opens to the home dimension of the serpent god Nāga; four of his servants emerge and devour Rip before turning on O-Sensei and his students. Bruce and the others kill the demons, but to close the gate, O-Sensei sacrifices himself by entering Nāga's realm. The chamber then collapses, leaving only the gate intact.

Years later, Richard discovers that millionaire Jeffrey Burr, leader of a dangerous snake cult named Kobra, has gained possession of the gate. Richard travels to Gotham City to ask Bruce for help, but they are attacked by a gang hired by Burr's chief killer Schlangenfaust. During this fight, Richard learns that Bruce is Batman and that Schlangenfaust is looking for Soul Breaker. They head for Gotham Chinatown to inform Shiva, the resident crime lord, but the cultists attack them there and Schlangenfaust uses the distraction to steal the sword. Needing assistance, the three recruit Ben, and together they track the cult to a heavily fortified island where the cult has taken the gate and are preparing to open it by sacrificing several kidnapped children to Soul Breaker. They also learn from Ben that years ago he had tracked Kobra after discovering that Rip was one of their members and that he learned that due to an obscure prophecy, Burr means to become Nāga's earthly avatar.

Arriving by plane, Batman, Richard, Shiva and Ben parachute down and penetrate Kobra's defenses through a set of catacombs. However, they encounter Schlangenfaust, who is revealed as one of Nāga's demonic servants. While Batman and Ben battle Schlangenfaust, Richard and Shiva prevent the sacrifice of the children and engage the cult members. Vanquishing their opponents, they corner Burr at the gate, but Burr turns Soul Breaker against himself, opening the doorway. Nāga emerges, having possessed O-Sensei's body, and swiftly overwhelms the companions. Nāga reveals that Richard is his actual destined host and tries to seduce him with promises of power, but Richard refuses and, with some help from Batman, uses Soul Breaker to banish him by stabbing O-Sensei.

Freed from Nāga's domination, O-Sensei bids his students farewell before dying in their arms. In order to close the gate forever, Batman enters Nāga's dimension wielding Soul Breaker, but Richard, Shiva and Ben willingly follow him. Once the gate has closed, the four prepare for battle against Nāga and his demon horde.

Cast
 David Giuntoli as Bruce Wayne / Batman
 Mark Dacascos as Richard Dragon
 Kelly Hu as Lady Shiva. Hu previously voiced the character in the video game Batman: Arkham Origins.
 Michael Jai White as Ben Turner / Bronze Tiger. White previously portrayed the character on The CW TV series Arrow.
 James Hong as O-Sensei
 Jamie Chung as Jade Nguyen
 Josh Keaton as Jeffrey Burr
 Chris Cox as Rip Jagger
 Robin Atkin Downes as Schlangenfaust
 Grey Griffin as Lady Eve, Prostitute (uncredited), Sacrificial Boy (uncredited)
 Patrick Seitz as Sir Edmund Dorrance / King Snake
 Eric Bauza as Axe Gang Leader
 Erica Luttrell as Silver St. Cloud

Production
The film was announced on August 13, 2020, along with the film's voice cast. It features an original story set in the 1970s.

Release
The film was released on digital platforms on January 12, 2021, and was also released on Blu-ray and DVD on January 26, 2021.

Reception
The film was well received by critics. Based on  reviews collected on Rotten Tomatoes,  of critics have given the film a positive review. DVD Talk rated the film as 3 stars of 5 stars as "Recommended".

References

External links
 

2020s English-language films
2020s American animated films
2020s direct-to-video animated superhero films
2021 animated films
2021 films
2021 direct-to-video films
2020s superhero films
American adult animated films
Animated action films
Animated Batman films
Films set in the 1970s
Films directed by Sam Liu
American martial arts films
Films about cults
Studio Mir films